Sarah Willis may refer to:

 Sarah Willis (hornist)
 Sarah Willis (author)